Cinnamon Roll Day or Cinnamon Bun Day falls on 4 October each year. It is an annual theme day created for marketing purposes in Sweden and Finland that was instituted in 1999 by Kaeth Gardestedt. At the time, she was a project manager for Home Baking Council (Hembakningsrådet) which was historically a trade group supported by yeast manufacturers, flour producers, sugar manufacturers, and margarine manufacturers, and is now supported by the Dansukker brand of sugar.

Cultural role 
The purpose of the celebration is to increase attention on Swedish baking traditions, with a particular focus on cinnamon buns, and to increase the consumption of yeast, flour, sugar, and margarine. The day is promoted through advertising signs in shops and cafés. Every year, IKEA stores around the world also commemorate the day by having promotions for Cinnamon buns on the month of October. Cinnamon buns are also featured in community events among Swedes in New Zealand and at the Church of Sweden Abroad.

Most official food celebrations are minor events that receive little attention, but the Swedish adoption of Cinnamon Roll Day has been unusually popular.

Date 
Cinnamon Roll Day is celebrated on 4 October because the Home Baking Council did not want the day to compete with other food traditions, such as sweet semla buns, which are served in Sweden on Shrove Tuesday. In Sweden, International Children's Day is celebrated on the first Monday of October. "A thought with Cinnamon Roll Day was that it would be a day of thoughtfulness".

See also 
Fika – Swedish practice that frequently features cinnamon rolls

References

External links 

 http://kanelbullensdag.se/en/ 

Recurring events established in 1999
October observances
Pastries
Cinnamon
Swedish culture
Finnish culture
Holiday foods